Goin' on with My Jesus is a studio album by American recording artist Wanda Jackson. It was released in 1991 via Amethyst Records and contained ten tracks. The project marked her thirty sixth studio album released in her career and her fourth album on Amethyst. The disc was a collection of gospel songs, featuring mostly original songs.

Background, content and release
Wanda Jackson became one of the first women to have commercial stardom in both the country and Rockabilly music fields. During the 1950s and 1960s, she issued a series of charting singles in both genres including "Let's Have a Party", "Right or Wrong" and "The Box It Came In". She continued recording with her label until 1971 when she ultimately chose to pursue more gospel material. Jackson released a series of gospel albums during the 1980s and 1990s through various labels, including Amethyst Records. Goin' on with My Jesus was first announced in an interview with The Oklahoman in 1991.

Goin' on with My Jesus was first recorded in 1991 at Studio Seven in Oklahoma City, Oklahoma. It was produced by Gregg W. Gray. contained a total of ten tracks all centered around gospel music. Songs with a gospel theme included "The King Is Coming", "Jesus Changed Your Heart" and "I Will Glory on the Cross". The album also featured a cover of a gospel song originally recorded by Bill Gaither titled "He Touched Me". The project was released in 1991 on Amethyst Records and was available only as a cassette. Five songs were featured on either side of the tape. It marked Jackson's thirty sixth studio album in her career.

Track listing

Release history

References

1991 albums
Wanda Jackson albums